Gero Andreas Miesenböck  (born 15 July 1965) is an Austrian scientist. He is currently Waynflete Professor of Physiology and Director of the Centre for Neural Circuits and Behaviour (CNCB) at the University of Oxford and a fellow of Magdalen College, Oxford.

Education and early life 
A native of Austria, Miesenböck was educated at the University of Innsbruck and Umeå University in Sweden. He graduated sub auspiciis praesidentis rei publicae from the University of Innsbruck Medical School. Following his Doctor of Medicine (MD) in 1993, he undertook postdoctoral training with James Rothman.

Research and career 

Miesenböck is known as the founder of optogenetics. He was the first scientist to modify nerve cells genetically so that their electrical activity could be controlled with light. This involved inserting DNA for light-responsive opsin proteins into the cells. Miesenböck used similar genetic modifications to breed animals whose brains contained light-responsive nerve cells integrated into their circuitry, and was the first to demonstrate that the behaviour of these animals could be remote-controlled.

The principle of optogenetic control established by Miesenböck has been widely adopted, generalised to other biological systems, and technically improved. Most of Miesenböck's work continues to be done with Drosophila melanogaster (fruit flies), where it is possible to gain detailed insight into molecular, cellular, and physiological mechanisms of brain function that may relate to human health.

Before being appointed to the Waynflete Professorship in 2007, Miesenböck held faculty positions at Memorial Sloan-Kettering Cancer Center and Yale University. In 2011 he became founding director of the Center for Neural Circuits and Behavior.

Awards and honours 
In 2001, he received the Beckman Young Investigators Award.
In 2012 Miesenböck was awarded the InBev-Baillet Latour International Health Prize for "pioneering optogenetic approaches to manipulate neuronal activity and to control animal behaviour". 
In 2013 he shared the Brain Prize with Ernst Bamberg, Edward Boyden, Karl Deisseroth, Peter Hegemann and Georg Nagel, and the Jacob Heskel Gabbay Award in Biotechnology and Medicine with Edward Boyden and Karl Deisseroth. He was elected a Fellow of the Royal Society (FRS) in 2015. 
His certificate of election reads: 
In 2015 he received the Heinrich Wieland Prize "for his breakthrough concept of optogenetics and its proof of principle" and in 2016 the Wilhelm Exner Medal

Miesenböck was elected a member of the European Molecular Biology Organization (EMBO) in 2008, and a member of the Academy of Medical Sciences, United Kingdom in 2012, the Austrian Academy of Sciences in 2014, and the German Academy of Sciences Leopoldina in 2016.

In 2017, Trinity College Dublin awarded him an honorary doctorate.

In 2019, Miesenböck received the Rumford Prize for "extraordinary contributions related to the invention and refinement of optogenetics," with Ernst Bamberg, Ed Boyden, Karl Deisseroth, Peter Hegemann, and Georg Nagel. In the same year, he, Boyden, Deisseroth, and Hegemann won the Warren Alpert Foundation Prize. In 2020 he was awarded the Shaw Prize in Life Sciences, and in 2022 the Louisa Gross Horwitz Prize. In 2023 he received the Japan Prize.

References 

Austrian neuroscientists
University of Innsbruck alumni
Umeå University alumni
Members of the European Molecular Biology Organization
Waynflete Professors of Physiology
Fellows of Magdalen College, Oxford
Living people
Fellows of the Royal Society
1965 births
Members of the German Academy of Sciences Leopoldina